C. hirsuta  may refer to:
 Campomanesia hirsuta, a plant species endemic to Brazil
 Canephora hirsuta, a moth species found in Europe
 Cardamine hirsuta, the hairy bittercress, a winter annual plant species native to Europe and Asia

See also
 Hirsuta